Fritaja (Croatian) or frtalja (Slovenian; egg omelettes) is a Mediterranean Croatian and Slovenian dish. Both are specialties in Istria and north from Trieste in Goriška Brda and in Soča and Vipava Valleys. They are especially common in the springtime, as at that time there are many plants and vegetables such as wild asparagus, wild hops, herbs as fennel, mint, feverfew and chicory, tomatoes, young garlic sprouts and spices available to add to egg and some other ingredients, as small parts of old bread. Fritaje are many times prepared throughout the year with ham, mushrooms, sausages, bacon, white or red wine. The quantity of ingredients is never exactly defined.

Both the Croatian and Slovenian names come from the Venetian word fritaia, which means "fried".

Variants
A similar dish, also known as fritaja or frtalja, is also popular in western Slovenia (Slovene Littoral); here, the asparagus variant is known, but different herbs are also added.

See also
 Frittata, a similar dish from Italy
 Tortilla española, a similar dish from Spain

References

Croatian cuisine
Egg dishes
Omelettes
Slovenian cuisine